Myelopsis alatella is a species of snout moth in the genus Episcythrastis. It was described by George Duryea Hulst in 1887 and is known from the south-western United States, mainly California.

References

Moths described in 1887
Phycitini